Cabazon Dinosaurs, formerly Claude Bell's Dinosaurs, is  a roadside attraction in Cabazon, California, featuring two enormous, steel-and-concrete dinosaurs named Dinny the Dinosaur and Mr. Rex. Located just west of Palm Springs, the  Brontosaurus and the  Tyrannosaurus rex are visible from the freeway to travelers passing by on Southern California's Interstate 10. The roadside dinosaurs are best known for their appearance in the film Pee-wee's Big Adventure (1985).

Sculptor and theme park artist Claude Bell began construction of the dinosaurs in 1964 with the goal of attracting more customers to his nearby restaurant, the Wheel Inn (open from 1958 to 2013). Dinny and Mr. Rex were completed in 1975 and 1986, respectively. Bell died in 1988 at age 91 and his family sold the property in the mid-1990s. Since then, Cabazon Dinosaurs has been the site of a roadside creationist museum and giftshop.

History

The creation of the Cabazon dinosaurs began in the 1960s by Knott's Berry Farm sculptor and portrait artist Claude K. Bell (1897–1988) to attract customers to his Wheel Inn Restaurant (1958-2013), which opened in 1958 and closed in 2013. It also got demolished in December, 2016. Dinny, the first of the Cabazon dinosaurs, was started in 1964 and created over a span of eleven years. Bell created Dinny out of spare material salvaged from the construction of nearby Interstate 10 at a cost of $300,000. The biomorphic building that was to become Dinny was first erected as steel framework over which an expanded metal grid was formed in the shape of a dinosaur. All of it was then covered with coats of shotcrete (spray concrete). His original vision for Dinny was for the dinosaur's eyes to glow and mouth to spit fire at night, predicting, "It'll scare the dickens out of a lot of people driving up over the pass." These two features, however, were not added.

A second dinosaur, Mr. Rex, was constructed near Dinny in 1981. Originally, a giant slide was installed in Rex's tail; it was later filled in with concrete, making the slide unusable. A third woolly mammoth sculpture and a prehistoric garden were drafted but never completed due to Bell's death in 1988.

Claude Bell

Claude K. Bell (1896-1988) began his artistic career as a teenager sculpting teddy bears in the sand on the beach at Atlantic City, New Jersey in front of a wooden building that was shaped like an elephant.  Tips from passersby encouraged him, and before long he was making a living with his sand sculptures at state and county fairs across the country.  In 1947, Walter Knott hired him to create the concrete sculptures of Handsome Brady and Whiskey Bill, who sit on the bench beside the Gold Trails Hotel in Ghost Town at Knott’s Berry Farm.

These were well received by guests, and led to more concrete bench sculptures, including the Calico Belles, who were patterned after real people, Marilyn Schuler, who was a dancer in the Calico Saloon, and Cecelia Peterson, who was a singer there.

Bell also operated the portrait studio at Knott’s from 1951 to 1986.  He, his wife, and his daughter, Wendy, all worked there creating portraits of guests.  His original portrait studio is now the Rock and Geode Shop.  The interior fireplace, mantle, and relief of Mark Twain therein were all sculpted by Claude Bell.  Knott’s still has artists (with Kaman's Art Shoppes operating the concession) who create pastel portraits of guests at a venue at the north end of Camp Snoopy.

Knott commissioned Bell to execute the minuteman statue at the full-scale replica of Independence Hall at Knott’s Berry Farm.  Bell painted portraits of Walter and Cordelia Knott which hang in the Chicken Dinner Restaurant.  He also sculpted a bust of Walter Knott which is in Independence Hall, and a copy of which is on display at the ghost town of Calico, California.

Perhaps inspired by Knott, Bell purchased 78 acres near Cabazon in 1946.  There he built the Wheel Inn Café, which opened in 1958.  Remembering the building that was shaped like an elephant in Atlantic City, Bell began building a life-sized, concrete dinosaur to attract customers to his café in 1964.  Over the next 11 years, he built the 150-foot-long brontosaurus, and later, the 100-ton tyrannosaurus.

Creationist museum

Following the sale of the property by Bell's surviving family in the mid-1990s, Cabazon Family Partnership and MKA Cabazon Partnership of Costa Mesa, California, became the new owners of the roadside attraction. The partnership obtained approval for an expansion of the Cabazon dinosaur site in 1996 with the land-use approvals, including restaurants, a museum and gift shop, and a 60-room motel at the Main Street exit in Cabazon. Orange County developer and MKA partner Gary Kanter said the original vision has been for MKA to transform the area into a children's science and museum exhibit.

Currently located inside Dinny are a gift store and museum promoting creationism, with some of the toy dinosaurs in the shop sold under the label "Don't swallow it! The fossil record does not support evolution." The current ownership has expressed a young Earth creationist belief that most dinosaurs were created on Earth about 6,000 years ago – the same day as Adam and Eve. In stark contrast to that belief are Bell's painted frescoes and sculptures inside Dinny, depicting a naturalist and evolutionary viewpoint. Bell's paintings include representations of Cro-Magnon man (labeled "Cro-Magnon Man 30,000 [years ago]") and Java Man (labeled "Java Man 400,000"). Bell's historic displays now exist alongside information detailing the creationist viewpoint of the earth and man's origins.

The Cabazon Dinosaurs attraction also features an open-air museum with fiberglass and robotic dinosaurs. Other activities at the site include a sand pit where visitors can experience a "dino dig" as well as a gemstone and fossil-panning sluice. Pastor Robert Darwin Chiles, assisting Kanter in turning the exhibit into a non-denominational church, has been quoted as to his belief of why children are drawn to the dinosaur attraction: "There's something in their DNA that knows man walked with these creatures on Earth." Chiles and Kanter plan to promote their views of creationism at the attraction based on their interpretation of the Book of Genesis.

In popular culture

 The popular 1985 comedy film Pee-wee's Big Adventure filmed several scenes around the dinosaurs.
 The dinosaurs and Wheel Inn appear in the music video of "Everybody Wants To Rule The World" (1985) by the English pop group Tears for Fears.
 The dinosaurs appear near the end of the 1989 film The Wizard, including a scene set inside of Dinny.
In 1994, Huell Howser Productions, in association with KCET/Los Angeles, featured the dinosaurs (along with the nearby Hadley's Fruit Orchards store) in Visiting...with Huell Howser; the 29-minute program is available on VHS. A repeat visit by Howser was made in 1999.
The dinosaurs, particularly Mr. Rex, are referenced in Fallout: New Vegas. The town of Novac is home to Dinky, a concrete T. rex that functions as both a gift shop and a sniper's nest.
The landmark is featured in Susanna Hoffs's video "Raining".

See also 

 List of dinosaur parks
 Novelty architecture
 Wall Drug – a tourist attraction and shopping mall in South Dakota which features an 80-foot concrete dinosaur

References

External links

 
 Roadside America

Dinosaur sculptures
Cabazon, California
Colossal statues in the United States
Concrete sculptures in California
Museums in Riverside County, California
Landmarks of Riverside County, California
Novelty buildings in California
Roadside attractions in California
Creationist museums in the United States
Religious museums in California
Tourist attractions in Riverside County, California
San Gorgonio Pass
Pee-wee Herman